The  Asian Men's Volleyball Championship was the eighteenth staging of the Asian Men's Volleyball Championship, a biennial international volleyball tournament organised by the Asian Volleyball Confederation (AVC) with Islamic Republic of Iran Volleyball Federation (IRIVF). The tournament was held in Tehran, Iran from 31 July to 8 August 2015.

Qualification
If there are not more than 16 teams, all teams will compete in the tournament.
If there are more than 16 teams, participating teams are:
– The host nation
– Top 10 ranked teams from the previous edition
– Representatives from each of the five Asian Volleyball Confederation Zonal Associations

There are 17 teams applied for the competition. But all teams can participate in the tournament.

Pools composition
Teams were seeded in the first two positions of each pool following the serpentine system according to their FIVB World Ranking as of 22 September 2014. AVC reserved the right to seed the hosts as head of pool A regardless of the World Ranking. All teams not seeded were drawn in Tehran, Iran on 22 April 2015. But, Saudi Arabia later withdrew and Oman moved from pool A to C to balance the number of teams in each pool. Rankings are shown in brackets except the hosts who ranked 10th.

Venues

Pool standing procedure
 Number of matches won
 Match points
 Points ratio
 Sets ratio
 Result of the last match between the tied teams

Match won 3–0 or 3–1: 3 match points for the winner, 0 match points for the loser
Match won 3–2: 2 match points for the winner, 1 match point for the loser

Preliminary round
All times are Iran Daylight Time (UTC+04:30).

Pool A

Pool B

Pool C

Pool D

Classification round
All times are Iran Daylight Time (UTC+04:30).
The results and the points of the matches between the same teams that were already played during the preliminary round shall be taken into account for the classification round.
Pool E

Pool F

Pool G

Pool H

Final round
All times are Iran Daylight Time (UTC+04:30).

13th–16th places

13th–16th semifinals

15th place match

13th place match

9th–12th places

9th–12th semifinals

11th place match

9th place match

Final eight

Quarterfinals

5th–8th semifinals

Semifinals

7th place match

5th place match

3rd place match

Final

Final standing

Awards

Most Valuable Player
 Kunihiro Shimizu
Best Setter
 Hideomi Fukatsu
Best Outside Spikers
 Purya Fayazi
 Hamzeh Zarini
Best Middle Blockers
 Zhang Zhejia
 Mostafa Sharifat
Best Opposite Spiker
 Farhad Piroutpour
Best Libero
 Daisuke Sakai

See also
2015 Asian Women's Volleyball Championship

References

External links
Official website
Organizer's website
Regulations
Squads

Asian men's volleyball championships
2015 in Iranian sport
Asian Men's Volleyball Championship
International volleyball competitions hosted by Iran
Sport in Tehran